Lucile Schmid or Lucile Provost (born August 26, 1962) is a French politician of the Europe Ecology – The Greens party (EELV). She serves in the French Ministry of Economy and Finances and she is co-president of the Green European Foundation (GEF).

Life
Schmid was born in Versailles in 1962.

After joining the environmentalist party, Lucile Schmid participates in the 2010 regional campaign, especially in the Hauts-de-Seine where she lives, but without being a candidate. She was involved in the construction of the Europe Ecology – The Greens party (EELV). She is also a member of the founding college of the Political Ecology Foundation (alongside, among others, Jean-Paul Besset and Alain Lipietz)).

During the cantonal elections of 2011, she was a candidate for the EELV in the canton of Issy-les-Moulineaux-East, she obtained 15.13% of the votes in the first round. In the second round, she supported the Socialist Party candidate.

In the leadership of the party, she was appointed co-director of the campaign for the presidential elections of 2012. After the Europe Ecology The Greens convention of November 2013 she started three years in the executive office where she is responsible for monitoring climate negotiations.

She is a board member of the think tank La Fabrique écologique8 and the editorial board of the revue Esprit magazine. In 2018 she serves in the French Ministry of Economy and Finances and she was co-president of the Green European Foundation (GEF).

Publications 
 La Seconde Guerre d’Algérie, le quiproquo franco algérien (sous le nom de Lucile Provost), Paris, Flammarion, 1996 
 Le Bruit du tic tac, Paris, Robert Laffont, 2000 
 Une femme au pays des hommes politiques, Paris, Flammarion, 2003 
 L’Égalité en danger ?, Paris, Bourin, 2006 
 Parité circus, Paris, Calmann-Lévy, 2008 
 L'écologie est politique avec Catherine Larrère et Olivier Fressard, Paris, Les Petits matins/Fondation de l'Écologie politique, 2013 
 Dossier « Les mondes de l'écologie » (coordination), revue Esprit, 2018

References

1962 births
Living people
People from Versailles
French politicians